Goetze and Gwynn is an organ builder in England which has a specialism in restoring pre-Victorian British organs.

Company

Dominic Gwynn started organ building with Hendrik ten Bruggencate in Northampton in 1976, before going into
partnership with Martin Goetze in 1980. Initially located in Northampton, the company relocated in 1985 to the Welbeck Estate near Worksop in north Nottinghamshire. A third partner, Edward Bennett, joined in 1985.

Martin Goetze died on 23 August 2015. The company continues to restore and produce organs, but according to its website its focus has shifted somewhat from the original directors' emphasis on re-creating the musical culture of the past.

Reconstructions
The company has produced organs in Tudor style based on the remains of two Tudor organ soundboards discovered in Suffolk. Two of these instruments are managed by the Royal College of Organists.

Restorations
Among the organs they have restored are:
Great Budworth
 The organ of St Mary and All Saints' Church, Great Budworth
London
 The organ of St Helen's Bishopsgate, which was damaged by a terrorist bomb attack in 1992
 Handel's instrument at St Lawrence Whitchurch (1994)
Wrexham
The Bevington organ at Erddig Hall (2016)

References

External links
 Website

Pipe organ building companies
Organ builders of the United Kingdom
Companies established in 1980
Companies based in Nottinghamshire
Musical instrument manufacturing companies of the United Kingdom